The International Union of Reformed Churches(IURC) is an International Christian organization which promotes unity between conservative Reformed churches and Orthodox Presbyterian Churches around the world.

History 

The International Union of Reformed Churches(IURC) was composed 2011 by the member churches of Korea, Germany, Britain, Indonesia, Chinese Area, Oceania and departed In 2012 it was founded with members of the Community of Reformed Church’s members.

The International Union of Reformed Churches is an international organization established on January 17, 2012 to promote cooperation and fellowship with the World Reformed Church Community and the Presbyterian Church Community.

The IURC is a fellowship, not a council, and wants to fulfill the dream of John Calvin, John Knox, John Gresham Machen and many others to unite historical Reformed Christians by the Confessional Reformed

Members have to agree with:

 The statement that "The Scriptures of the Old and New Testament are without error in all that they teach."

 At least one of the following historic Reformed Confessions – The Scot Confession(1560), The Belgic Confession(1561), The Heidelberg Catechism(1563), The Canons of Dort(1619), The Westminster Confession of Faith(1643).

Denominational Area members 

As of November 2017, there are 12 denominational members:

 Republic of Korea (Two)
 Germany (One)
 Britain (One)
 Australia (Two)
 New Zealand (One)
 Chinese Area (Five)

References

External links
IURC website

Presbyterianism
International bodies of Reformed denominations
Christian organizations established in 2012